Budapest Rangers, founded in 2004, are a bandy sports club based in Budapest, Hungary.

The club is probably the best team in Hungary, with many of the players representing the Hungarian national bandy team. There has been a cup competition played between six teams with smaller sized teams than the traditional eleven due to a shortage of players in Hungary.  The club's first team finished in second place with the second team finishing in third position.

References

External links
Club website

2004 establishments in Hungary
Bandy clubs established in 2004
Bandy clubs in Hungary
Organisations based in Budapest
Sport in Budapest